Grace Episcopal Church and Guild Hall is a historic site in Port Orange, Florida, United States. It is located at 4100 Ridgewood Avenue. On February 5, 1998, it was added to the U.S. National Register of Historic Places.

References

External links
 Volusia County listings at National Register of Historic Places
 Grace Episcopal Church and Guild Hall at Florida's Office of Cultural and Historical Programs

Episcopal church buildings in Florida
National Register of Historic Places in Volusia County, Florida
Churches on the National Register of Historic Places in Florida
Carpenter Gothic church buildings in Florida
Buildings and structures in Port Orange, Florida
Churches in Volusia County, Florida
1893 establishments in Florida
Churches completed in 1893